Hales  may refer to:

Hale's, a.k.a. Hale Bros. Co., a former department store chain in Northern California, United States
Hale's a.k.a. J. M. Hale Co., a former Los Angeles department store, United States

Places
 Hales, Norfolk, England, United Kingdom
 Hales, Staffordshire, England, United Kingdom
 Haleş, a village in Tisău Commune, Buzău County, Romania
 Hales Creek, Ohio, United States

People
 Hales (king) (379 BC), of Triballi

See also
Hales (surname)
Hailes (disambiguation)
Thales